Damian Michael Spencer (born 19 September 1981) is an English former professional footballer who played as a forward from 1998 to 2012.

He played for Windsor & Eton, Bristol City, Exeter City, Cheltenham Town, Brentford , Kidderminster Harriers, Aldershot Town, Eastbourne Borough, Grimsby Town and Windsor.

Career
He started his career with Windsor & Eton, before moving into the football league with Bristol City. He was released by Bristol City in April 2001, and had a spell with non-League club Atherstone United, before joining Cheltenham Town in 2002. Whilst at Bristol City he also had a loan spell with Exeter City.

In January 2008, he was set to join fellow League One side Crewe Alexandra for £150,000. However, a long-standing knee injury meant that he failed his medical examination, which meant that the potential transfer collapsed.

He joined Brentford on loan on 20 March 2009, after financial constraints forced his parent club Cheltenham to reduce their wage bill. In July 2009, Spencer left Cheltenham Town, and signed for Kettering Town.

He was signed on loan in November 2009 to Conference National side Kidderminster Harriers. In February 2010, he joined League Two outfit Aldershot Town on loan until the end of the season. He subsequently joined Aldershot on a one-year contract in July 2010.

On 24 June 2011 Damian signed a one-year contract with Grimsby Town. After struggling to break into the first team setup at Grimsby, his contract was cancelled by mutual consent on Thursday 5 January 2012.

On 31 March 2012 Spencer joined Windsor until the end of the season.

In February 2013 Damian was playing in the Cheltenham League Division 3 for Village Real.

Honours
with Cheltenham Town
Football League Two play-off winner: [[2006 Football 
League Two play-off Final 2006
With Brentford 
Football League Two League Champions 2009
withGrimsby Town
 Lincolnshire Senior Cup: Winner, 2011–12

Career statistics

References

External links
Damian Spencer player profile at ctfc.com

1981 births
People from Ascot, Berkshire
Living people
English footballers
Association football forwards
Aldershot Town F.C. players
Atherstone Town F.C. players
Brentford F.C. players
Bristol City F.C. players
Cheltenham Town F.C. players
Eastbourne Borough F.C. players
Exeter City F.C. players
Grimsby Town F.C. players
Kettering Town F.C. players
Kidderminster Harriers F.C. players
Windsor F.C. players
Windsor & Eton F.C. players
English Football League players
National League (English football) players